Cornelius "Neil" Casey (January 9, 1929 – October 17, 2001) was a former Irish-American football (soccer) player.  He earned four caps, scoring one goal, as a member of the U.S. national team.

Youth
Casey was born in Cahersiveen, County Kerry, Ireland.  His mother died when he was six and he lived most of his youth in a Cork City orphanage.  He left the orphanage when he was eighteen, served two years in the Irish Army, then moved to the United States, settling in New York City when he was twenty-one.  He work at the NYSC.  Soon after his arrival he entered the U.S. Army, serving during the Korean War.

Professional career
When Casey arrived in New York, he joined the German-American soccer team, most likely in the German American Soccer League.  In 1951, Casey played for the New York Americans of the American Soccer League. In 1954, they won the league title and the National Challenge Cup against St Louis.

National team
Casey earned all four of his caps in the four World Cup qualification matches played by the U.S. national team in 1954.  His first cap came in a January 10, 1954 qualification loss to Mexico. That was followed by another loss to Mexico four days later which put the U.S. out of the cup. In April, the U.S., with Casey, flew to Haiti for two meaningless qualification games. Despite the lack of significance, the U.S. won both games, played on the third and fourth of April.  Casey opened the scoring in the twentieth minute of the April 3rd game, a 3-2 U.S. victory.

Personal life
Following his retirement from playing, Casey helped establish the first youth league in Ridgefield.  He graduated from New York University with a bachelor's degree in engineering and later earned a master's degree in electrical engineering from the University of Connecticut.  He worked for Barnes Engineering of Connecticut as an aerospace engineer for thirty-two years. He specialized in rocket guidance and infrared systems and worked on the Apollo Missions.  In 1994, he retired to Vermont. Casey died of lung cancer on October 17, 2001.  He is buried in Burlington, Vermont in New Mount Calvery Cemetery. 
Casey also had seven children, most of which reside in Fairfield County, Connecticut.

Career statistics

International goals

External links
 National Soccer Hall of Fame walk of fame brick
 Obituary

1929 births
2001 deaths
People from Cahersiveen
New York University alumni
University of Connecticut alumni
American soccer players
United States men's international soccer players
American Soccer League (1933–1983) players
New York Americans (soccer) (1933–1956) players
Irish Army personnel
United States Army personnel of the Korean War
American aerospace engineers
Deaths from lung cancer
Deaths from cancer in Vermont
Burials in Vermont
Soccer players from Vermont
Association football midfielders
20th-century American engineers
Irish emigrants to the United States